Oliver Charles Currill (born 27 February 1997) is an English cricketer. He made his first-class debut on 28 March 2017 for Gloucestershire against Durham MCCU as part of the Marylebone Cricket Club University fixtures.

References

External links
 

1997 births
Living people
English cricketers
Gloucestershire cricketers
Sportspeople from Banbury